This list of Asian television awards is an index to articles on notable awards for contributions in various fields of television in Asia. The list is organized by region and country, although some awards are open to television performers or shows from more than one country.

General

East Asia

South Asia

Southeast Asia

Western Asia

See also

 List of television awards

References

Asia